Aniboom was an online animation studio which distributed independent animated short films and occasionally co-produced them. It was founded in 2006 by former Israeli television executive Uri Shinar. Within three years, over 13,000 clips were released through the studio, at which point The New York Times described Aniboom's business structure as perhaps the largest example of crowdsourcing in the entertainment industry.

The studio's website went live in late September, 2006. Its official launch was not announced however, until November 24 of that year. The launch was accompanied by a contest, running through January 30 of the following year, in which the creators of the website's most highly rated films up to that point received monetary prizes. Over the following years, similar contests were held, and Aniboom expanded its online presence to include channels on Joost and YouTube. In 2008, the studio raised $10 million in investor funding.

The Aniboom short "Live Music" was picked up by Sony for theatrical distribution in 2009, as an opener for Planet 51. The same year, Aniboom ran a competition in partnership with the Fox Broadcasting Company – the best holiday themed short film, as chosen by Fox executives, would win $15,000 and the possibility of a development deal. The contest was won by Jay Malone for the short film Santa Intervention. 

As of 2016 the official website has closed and the official YouTube channel has been terminated.

References

External links 
 Aniboom Facebook Page
 Aniboom Dailymotion Page

American film websites
Websites about animation
Internet properties established in 2006
Israeli film websites
Defunct websites